St. Claire is a town in Saint John Parish, Antigua and Barbuda. It is located in the Major Division of Potters.

History

St. Clare Estate 
When Dr. Raeburn and his wife built the new stairs to the entrance in the 1930s, it appears that they filled the new stairs with many of the old burial stones that were on the property at the time. The doctor's daughter, Rita Raeburn, said that a copse of enormous old tamarind trees served as a marker for a slave burial place. When she last checked, one marker was still there. The property provides a view of the Allen's (#48), Gillead/Providence/Mills (#189), Bendal's Estate (#37), and McNish Mountain.

This plantation, which used to be known as the Body, was rented out for £900 a year and occasionally "underlet" for £120. 

The British Parliament gave the St. Clare estate a legacy award of £10,041 for freeing 62 slaves after slavery was abolished in 1833. Rowland Edward Williams received the prize.

In the 1940s, Dr. Robert Raeburn built a dairy farm with Robert Hall at Smith's (#161) while serving as the island's top government vet. They had stunning, sizable gardens with a wide variety of trees and plants, including one enormous, old oak tree that is still there near to the west of the original house. The grounds are still being roamed by peacocks.

A plaque that reads, "St. Clare originally known as The Body Plantation of Colonel Roland Williams and his heirs from 1680-1842," is located above one of the outbuildings. huge bells similar to these were used to call the laborers when the area was being surveyed by Edward St. Clare in 1772. Mears & Staenbank Founders, London, was commissioned by the estate to manufacture an 18-inch bell in 1860. It still lays in the yard, despite having recently cracked. The majority of plantations featured sizable bells like this one that were used to call in the estate employees. 

The Alexander Willock, Esq.-drawn map of the estate was also in the possession of the Raeburn family. It displays the entire layout, including the position of the sugar mill and other structures as well as the number of fields, acres, and roads. John Killean was the surveyor.

Demographics 
St. Claire has two enumeration districts.

 33501  St. Claire_1
 33502  St. Claire_2

References 

Populated places in Antigua and Barbuda
Saint John Parish, Antigua and Barbuda